Concord, Texas may refer to:
Concord, Cherokee County, Texas
Concord, Leon County, Texas

See also
Concord (disambiguation)